They're Always Caught is a 1938 American short crime film directed by Harold S. Bucquet and starring Stanley Ridges. It was produced by MGM. In 1939, it was nominated for an Academy Award for Best Live Action Short Film, Two-Reel at the 11th Academy Awards.

Cast
 Stanley Ridges as Doctor John Pritchard
 John Eldredge as Jimmy Stark
 Louis Jean Heydt as Eddie Diesel
 Charles Waldron as Mayor Fletcher

References

External links
 
 
 

1938 films
1938 crime films
American crime films
American black-and-white films
Films directed by Harold S. Bucquet
Metro-Goldwyn-Mayer short films
1930s English-language films
1930s American films